Fatal may refer to:

 Fatal (album), by Hussein Fatal, 2002
 Fatal (film), a 2010 French film starring Michaël Youn and Stéphane Rousseau
 F.A.T.A.L., a tabletop role-playing game released in 2003
 Fatal Recordings, a record label founded by Hanin Elias
 Fatal, a rapper who collaborated with the band Therapy? on the song "Come and Die" from the Judgment Night film soundtrack
 "Fatal", a song by Motionless in White from Infamous
 "Fatal", a song by Pearl Jam from Lost Dogs

See also
 
 Fatale (disambiguation)
 Fatalis (disambiguation)
 Fatalism, a philosophical doctrine
 Fate (disambiguation)
 Fattal, a surname
 Lethal (disambiguation)
 Death, the foreboding of